Congo is a 1980 science fiction novel by Michael Crichton, the fifth under his own name and the fifteenth overall. The novel centers on an expedition searching for diamonds and investigating the mysterious deaths of a previous expedition in the dense tropical rainforest of the Congo. Crichton calls Congo a lost world novel in the tradition founded by Henry Rider Haggard's King Solomon's Mines, featuring the mines of that work's title.

Plot summary
The novel starts in 1979, with an abrupt end to an expedition sent by Earth Resource Technology Services Inc (ERTS). In the dense rainforests of the Virunga region, the heart of the Congo, the team is suddenly attacked and killed by unknown creatures – all contact with them is immediately lost. The expedition, which was searching for deposits of diamonds, discovered the fictional lost city of Zinj. A video image taken by a camera there, and transmitted by satellite to the base station in Houston, shows a peculiar race of grey-haired gorillas to be responsible for the murders.

Another expedition, led by Karen Ross, is launched to find out the truth and to find the Lost City of Zinj, where there are believed to be deposits of a certain diamond, the type IIb, which are naturally boron-doped and thus useful as semiconductors, though worthless as gemstones. This time, the searchers bring along the famous White African mercenary Charles Munro, as well as a female mountain gorilla named Amy, who has been trained to communicate with humans using sign language, and her trainer Peter Elliot.

Time is of the greatest essence, as a rival consortium from corporations in Japan, Germany, and the Netherlands are also searching for the diamonds, turning the entire expedition into a race to the city of Zinj. Unfortunately for Ross and her team, the American expedition encounters many delays along the way, including plane crashes, native civil wars, and jungle predators.

Eventually, Ross and her expedition reach the Lost City of Zinj and discover the consortium's camp, like the original expedition's camp, in ruins and devoid of life. Ross and her team then encounter killer gorillas and are attacked. A brief battle ensues and several gorillas are killed.

After studying the corpses and performing a rudimentary field autopsy, it is concluded the animals are not "true" gorillas by modern biological standards, nor kakundakari (an African primate cryptid), but gorilla/chimpanzee/human hybrids: their mass and height is closer to humans than gorillas, their skull is greatly malformed (the "ridge" that makes gorilla heads look "pointy" is nearly nonexistent) and their pigmentation is on the border of albinism: light gray fur and yellow eyes. They also exhibit behavior unlike normal gorillas:  they are highly aggressive, ruthless and partially nocturnal, as well as extremely social, forming troops of over a hundred, compared to a mere dozen animals. Elliot intends to name them Gorilla elliotensis after himself.

Afterwards, Ross, Elliot, and Munro explore the ruins and discover that the killer gorillas were bred by the ancient inhabitants of Zinj to serve as guards to protect the diamond mines from intruders. After several more attacks and the loss of contact with the ERTS HQ due to a massive solar flare, Elliot, with the help of Amy, finds a way to translate the language of the new gorillas (she refers to them as "bad gorillas") and piece together three messages ("go away", "no come", "bad here"); they stop fighting the humans and become confused, leaving the camp.

Their victory is cut short by the eruption of the nearby volcano (accelerated by explosives placed by Ross for her geological surveys) which buries the city, the diamond fields and all proof of the "new" species under 800 meters of lava. Ross, Elliot, Munro, and the rest of the team's survivors are forced to run for their lives. The team manages to find a hot air balloon in a crashed consortium cargo aircraft and uses it to escape.

In an epilogue, it is revealed that Munro was able to retrieve a few hundred carats of the valuable diamonds and sold them to Intel for use in a revolutionary new computer processor, while Amy was reintroduced into the wild and was later observed teaching her offspring sign language.

Adaptations
Crichton wanted to produce a modern-day version of King Solomon's Mines. He pitched the idea to 20th Century Fox who bought the film rights before the story had even been written. This rapid development resulted in Crichton suffering writer's block, which he treated by spending time in an isolation tank. Crichton received a $1.5 million advance for the novel, screenplay and as a directing fee. He had never worked that way before, usually writing the book then selling it. He eventually managed to finish the book and it became a best seller.

Crichton started writing the screenplay in 1981 after completing the film Looker. He had enjoyed working with Sean Connery on The Great Train Robbery and wrote Congo hoping to make the film version with Connery in the lead and Crichton to direct. In 1987 he was still hoping to make the film with Connery and Crichton himself directing but this did not happen. Despite not taking part in the eventual 1995 Congo film, Connery did go on to play Allan Quatermain - the character who provided the inspiration for Munro - in The League of Extraordinary Gentlemen.

In 1995, a film version of Congo was released, directed by Frank Marshall and starring Laura Linney, Dylan Walsh, Ernie Hudson, Tim Curry, Grant Heslov, Joe Don Baker, and Shayna Fox as the voice of Amy. The version received negative reviews from critics, and was nominated for several Golden Raspberry Awards including Worst Picture. Despite this, the film had a successful box office performance, grossing $152 million worldwide.

In 1984 Telarium released a graphic adventure based on Congo. Because Crichton had sold all adaptation rights to the novel, he set the game—named Amazon—in South America, and Amy the gorilla became Paco the parrot.

Influences

The use of language by gorillas was inspired in part by the efforts of Dr. Penny Patterson to teach American Sign Language to Koko.

References

1980 American novels
1980 science fiction novels
Lost world novels
Novels by Michael Crichton
American science fiction novels
American novels adapted into films
Novels about animals
Alfred A. Knopf books
Novels set in the 1970s
Fictional gorillas
Novels set in the Democratic Republic of the Congo